The Hungary national baseball team is the national baseball team of Hungary. The team represents Hungary in international competitions.

Roster
Hungary's roster for the European Baseball Championship Qualifier 2022, the last official competition in which the team took part.

Tournament results
European Under-21 Baseball Championship

References

National baseball teams in Europe
Baseball